Korean Americans are Americans of Korean ancestry (mostly from South Korea, North Korea). In 2015, the Korean-American community constituted about 0.56% of the United States population, or about 1.82 million people, and was the fifth-largest Asian Americans subgroup, after the Chinese Americans, Filipino Americans, Indian Americans, and Vietnamese Americans communities. The U.S. is home to the largest Korean diaspora community in the world.

Demographics

According to the 2010 Census, there were approximately 1.7 million people of Korean descent residing in the United States, making it the country with the second-largest Korean population living outside Korea (after the People's Republic of China). The ten states with the largest estimated Korean American populations were California (452,000; 1.2%), New York (141,000, 0.7%), New Jersey (94,000, 1.1%), Virginia (71,000, 0.9%), Texas (68,000, 0.3%), Washington (62,400, 0.9%), Illinois (61,500, 0.5%), Georgia (52,500, 0.5%), Maryland (49,000, 0.8%), Pennsylvania (41,000, 0.3%), and Colorado (31,000, 0.4%). Hawaii was the state with the highest concentration of Korean Americans, at 1.8%, or 23,200 people.

The two metropolitan areas with the highest Korean American populations as per the 2010 Census were the Greater Los Angeles area Combined Statistical Area (334,329) and the Greater New York Combined Statistical Area (218,764). The Baltimore-Washington metropolitan area ranks third, with approximately 93,000 Korean Americans clustered in Howard and Montgomery Counties in Maryland and Fairfax County in Virginia. Southern California and the New York City metropolitan area have the largest populations of Koreans outside of the Korean Peninsula. Among Korean Americans born in Korea, the Los Angeles metropolitan area had 226,000 as of 2012; New York (including Northern New Jersey) had 153,000 Korean-born Korean Americans; and Washington had 60,000.

The percentage of Korean Americans in Bergen County, New Jersey, in the New York City Metropolitan Area, 6.3% by the 2010 United States Census (increased to 6.9% by the 2011 American Community Survey), is the highest of any county in the United States. All of the nation's top ten municipalities by percentage of Korean population as per the 2010 Census are located within Bergen County, while the concentration of Korean Americans in Palisades Park, New Jersey, in Bergen County, is the highest of any municipality in the United States, at 52% of the population. Between 1990 and 2000, Georgia was home to the fastest-growing Korean community in the U.S., growing at a rate of 88.2% over that decade. There is a significant Korean American population in the Atlanta metropolitan area, mainly in Gwinnett County (2.7% Korean) and Fulton County (1.0% Korean).

According to the statistics of the Overseas Korean Foundation and the Republic of Korea's Ministry of Foreign Affairs and Trade, 107,145 South Korean children were adopted into the United States between 1953 and 2007.

In a 2005 United States Census Bureau survey, an estimated 432,907 ethnic Koreans in the U.S. were native-born Americans, and 973,780 were foreign-born. Korean Americans that were naturalized citizens numbered at 530,100, while 443,680 Koreans in the U.S. were not American citizens.

While people living in North Korea cannot—except under rare circumstances—leave their country, there are many people of North Korean origin living in the U.S., a substantial portion who fled to the south during the Korean War and later emigrated to the United States. Since the North Korean Human Rights Act of 2004 allowed North Korean defectors to be admitted as refugees, about 130 have settled in the U.S. under that status.

History

One of the first Korean Americans was Seo Jae-pil, or Philip Jaisohn, who came to America shortly after participating in an abortive coup with other progressives to institute political reform in 1884. He became a citizen in 1890 and earned a medical degree in 1892 from what is now George Washington University. Throughout his life, he strove to educate Koreans in the ideals of freedom and democracy, and pressed the U.S. government for Korean independence. He died during the Korean War. His home is now a museum, cared for by a social services organization founded in his name in 1975.

A prominent figure among the Korean immigrant community is Ahn Chang Ho, pen name Dosan, a Protestant social activist. He came to the United States in 1902 for education. He founded the Friendship Society in 1903 and the Mutual Assistance Society. He was also a political activist during the Japanese occupation of Korea.

Another prominent figure among the Korean immigrant community was Syngman Rhee (이승만), a Methodist. He came to the United States in 1904 and earned a bachelor's degree at George Washington University in 1907, a master's degree at Harvard University, and a PhD from Princeton University in 1910. In 1910, he returned to Korea and became a political activist. He later became the first president of the Republic of Korea.

In 1903, the first group of Korean laborers came to Hawaii on January 13, now known annually as Korean-American Day, to fill in gaps created by problems with Chinese and Japanese laborers. Between 1904 and 1907, about 1,000 Koreans entered the mainland from Hawaii through San Francisco. Many Koreans dispersed along the Pacific Coast as farm workers or as wage laborers in mining companies and as section hands on the railroads. Picture brides became a common practice for marriage to Korean men.

Between 1905 and 1910, political activities in Korean American communities surged in opposition towards Japanese aggression towards Korea. Organizations formed throughout the US, much of which was concentrated in Hawaii and California. In 1909, two of the largest Korean-American organizations would merge to form the Korean National Association, the largest Korean immigrant organization in North America. Leaders included An Changho, Syngman Rhee and Park Yong-man. This organization along with others would play key roles in the Korean independence movement between 1910 and 1945.

After the annexation of Korea by Japan in 1910, Korean migration to the United States was virtually halted. The Immigration Act of 1924 or sometimes referred to as the Oriental Exclusion Act was part of a measured system excluding Korean immigrants into the US. In 1952 with the Immigration and Nationality Act of 1952, opportunities were more open to Asian Americans, enabling Korean Americans to move out of enclaves into middle-class neighborhoods. When the Korean War ended in 1953, small numbers of students and professionals entered the United States. A larger group of immigrants included women married with U.S. servicemen. In 1953, South Korea had allowed international adoption. This had stemmed from the result of the Korean war as it left many children displaced. As a result of allowing external adoption in South Korea, a majority of the children have been adopted from families across the United States. With the passage of the Immigration and Nationality Act of 1965, Koreans became one of the fastest growing Asian groups in the United States, surpassed only by Filipinos.

The Immigration and Nationality Act of 1965 abolished the quota system that had restricted the numbers of Asians allowed to enter the United States. Large numbers of Koreans, including some from North Korea who had come via South Korea, have been immigrating ever since, putting Korea in the top six countries of origin of immigrants to the United States since 1975. The reasons for immigration are many including the desire for increased freedom and the hope for better economic opportunities.

In the 1980s and 1990s Koreans became noted not only for starting small businesses such as dry cleaners or convenience stores, but also for diligently planting churches. They would venture into abandoned cities and start up businesses which happened to be predominantly African American in demographics. This would sometimes lead to publicized tensions with customers as dramatized in movies such as Spike Lee's Do the Right Thing and the Los Angeles riots of April 1992.

Their children, along with those of other Asian Americans, would also be noted in headlines and magazine covers in the 1980s for their numbers in prestigious universities and highly skilled white collar professions. Favorable socioeconomic status and education have led to the painting of Asian Americans, including Korean Americans, as a "model minority". However, this label is a controversial one: many individuals claim that the "model minority" label derides other communities of color and dismisses the challenges that the Korean Americans, and other Asian American ethnic groups, face. For instance, 12.8% of all Korean Americans live at or below the poverty line.

A large number of Korean Americans do not have health insurance due to language access barriers. Furthermore, older Korean Americans, who are at significant risk of developing mental health conditions, are less likely to access mental health services even when exhibiting symptoms. This is due to stigma and cultural misconceptions regarding mental health conditions.

Los Angeles has emerged as a major center of the Korean American community. It experienced rapid transition in the 1990s, with heavy investment by Korean banks and corporations, and the arrival of tens of thousands of Koreans, as well as even larger numbers of Hispanics. Many entrepreneurs opened small businesses, and were hard hit by the 1992 Los Angeles riots. More recently, L.A.'s Koreatown has been perceived to have experienced declining political power secondary to re-districting and an increased crime rate, prompting an exodus of Koreans from the area. Furthermore, the aftermath of the 1992 riots witnessed a large number of Koreans from Southern California moving to the San Francisco Bay Area and opening businesses and buying property near downtown Oakland, furthering the growth of that city's Koreatown until the early 2000s.

According to Park (1998) the violence against Korean Americans in 1992 stimulated a new wave of political activism among Korean Americans, but it also split them into two main camps. The "liberals" sought to unite with other minorities in Los Angeles to fight against racial oppression and scapegoating. The "conservatives," emphasized law and order and generally favored the economic and social policies of the Republican Party. The conservatives tended to emphasize the political differences between Koreans and other minorities, specifically blacks and Hispanics. Abelmann and Lie, (1997) report that the most profound result was the politicization of Korean Americans, all across the U.S. The younger generation especially realized they had been too uninvolved in American politics, and the riot shifted their political attention from South Korea to conditions in the United States.

Also accelerated by the 1992 riots, Orange County's Korean population grew from its starting point in Koreatown, Garden Grove. As of 2020, Orange County had the second largest number of Korean Americans of any county in America, neighboring Los Angeles County has the most, numbering over 100,000. Koreans originally moved into  Garden Grove after Olympic gold medalist Sammy Lee (diver) bought a home in the 1950s signaling to other ethnic minorities that they could move into Orange County. Since then, Koreans have spread throughout northern Orange County, mainly concentrating in  Buena Park,  Fullerton,  Cerritos,  Palma,  Cypress, and  Irvine. Garden Grove is now home to more than 1,500 Korean businesses, and has held a Korean festival, night market, and parade every year since 1983. Mostly older and more traditional Korean businesses and food are found in Garden Grove, while newer and trendier Seoul based chains often locate in Buena Park and Irvine. The Source OC is a multi-level Korean themed mall in Buena Park that houses over 100 restaurants, as well as korean themed bars, a school, K-pop stores, and a PC gaming cafe. 

A substantial number of affluent Korean American professionals have settled in Bergen County, New Jersey since the early 2000s (decade) and have founded various academically and communally supportive organizations, including the Korean Parent Partnership Organization at the Bergen County Academies magnet high school and The Korean-American Association of New Jersey. Holy Name Medical Center in Teaneck, New Jersey, within Bergen County, has undertaken an effort to provide comprehensive health care services to underinsured and uninsured Korean patients from a wide area with its Korean Medical Program, drawing over 1,500 Korean American patients to its annual health festival. Bergen County's Broad Avenue Koreatown in Palisades Park has emerged as a dominant nexus of Korean American culture, and its Senior Citizens Center provides a popular gathering place where even Korean grandmothers were noted to follow the dance trend of the worldwide viral hit Gangnam Style by South Korean "K-pop" rapper Psy in September 2012; while the nearby Fort Lee Koreatown is also emerging as such. The Chusok Korean Thanksgiving harvest festival has become an annual tradition in Bergen County, attended by several tens of thousands.

Bergen County's growing Korean community was cited by county executive Kathleen Donovan in the context of Hackensack, New Jersey attorney Jae Y. Kim's appointment to Central Municipal Court judgeship in January 2011. Subsequently, in January 2012, New Jersey Governor Chris Christie nominated attorney Phillip Kwon of Bergen County for New Jersey Supreme Court justice, although this nomination was rejected by the state's Senate Judiciary Committee, and in July 2012, Kwon was appointed instead as deputy general counsel of the Port Authority of New York and New Jersey. According to The Record of Bergen County, the U.S. Census Bureau has determined the county's Korean American population—2010 census figures put it at 56,773 (increasing to 63,247 by the 2011 American Community Survey)—grew enough to warrant language assistance during elections, and Bergen County's Koreans have earned significant political respect. As of May 2014, Korean Americans had garnered at least four borough council seats in Bergen County.

Flatbush boycott
In 1990, Korean-American owned shops were boycotted in the Flatbush section of the borough of Brooklyn in New York City. The boycott started by Black Nationalist, Sonny Carson, lasted for six months and became known as the Flatbush boycott.

Comfort women controversy
In May 2012, officials in Bergen County's borough of Palisades Park, New Jersey rejected requests by two diplomatic delegations from Japan to remove a small monument from a public park, a brass plaque on a block of stone, dedicated in 2010 to the memory of comfort women, thousands of women, many Koreans, who were forced into sexual slavery by Japanese soldiers during World War II. Days later, a South Korean delegation endorsed the borough's decision. However, in neighboring Fort Lee, various Korean American groups could not reach consensus on the design and wording for such a monument as of early April 2013. In October 2012, a similar memorial was announced in nearby Hackensack, to be raised behind the Bergen County Courthouse, alongside memorials to the Holocaust, the Great Irish Famine, the Armenian genocide, and Slavery in the United States and was unveiled in March 2013. An apology and monetary compensation of roughly $8,000,000 by Japan to South Korea in December 2015 for these crimes largely fell flat in Bergen County, where the first U.S. monument to pay respects to comfort women was erected.

East Sea controversy
According to The Record, the Korean-American Association of New Jersey petitioned Bergen County school officials in 2013 to use textbooks that refer to the Sea of Japan as the East Sea as well. In February 2014, Bergen County lawmakers announced legislative efforts to include the name East Sea in future New Jersey school textbooks. In April 2014, a bill to recognize references to the Sea of Japan also as the East Sea in Virginia textbooks was signed into law.

Sewol ferry tragedy memorial in the United States
In May 2014, the Palisades Park Public Library in New Jersey created a memorial dedicated to the victims of the tragic sinking of the Sewol ferry off the South Korean coast on April 16, 2014.

Nail salon abuse
According to a 2015 investigation by The New York Times, abuse by Korean nail salon owners in New York City and Long Island was rampant, with 70 to 80% of nail salon owners in New York being Korean, per the Korean American Nail Salon Association; with the growth and concentration in the number of salons in New York City far outstripping the remainder of the United States since 2000, according to the U.S. Census Bureau. Abuses routinely included underpayment and non-payment to employees for services rendered, exacting poor working conditions, and stratifying pay scales and working conditions for Korean employees above non-Koreans.

Recent statistics 
The Ministry of Foreign Affairs of the Republic of Korea estimates the number of Koreans to be 224,600 as of 2013.  However, it's hard to determine the accuracy of this reporting due to the figures being sourced from the Korean Consulate in Korea, and the channels of various Korean-affiliated organizations. For example, tens of thousands of immigrant women who have been married to USFK since the 1950s and who have been adopted since the liberation of the United States have not been identified in the Korean consulate statistics.

Languages

Korean Americans can speak a combination of English and Korean depending on where they were born and when they immigrated to the United States. New immigrants often use a mixture of Korean and English (Konglish), a practice also known as code-switching.

Memorials and celebrities
A number of U.S. states have declared January 13 as Korean American Day in order to recognize Korean Americans' impact and contributions. In 1903, the first group of Korean laborers came to Hawaii on January 13, to fill in gaps created by problems with Chinese and Japanese laborers.

Celebrities are named at List of Korean Americans.

Politics

In a poll from the Asia Times before the 2004 U.S. Presidential Election, Korean Americans narrowly favored Republican candidate George W. Bush by a 41% to 38% margin over Democrat John Kerry, with the remaining 19% undecided or voting for other candidates. However, according to a poll done by the AALDEF{ the majority of Korean Americans that voted in the 2004 Presidential Election favored Democrat John Kerry by a 66% to 33% margin over Republican candidate George W. Bush.

 And another poll done by the AALDEF suggest the majority of Korean Americans that voted in the 2008 Presidential Election favored Democrat Barack Obama by a 64% to 35% margin over Republican John McCain In the 2008 U.S. Presidential Election, Korean Americans favored Democrat Barack Obama over Republican John McCain, around 59% to 41%. However, there are still more registered Republican Korean Americans than registered Democrats. Korean-Americans, due to their Republican and Christian leanings, overwhelmingly supported California's constitutional gay marriage ban, Proposition 8. 

According to a multilingual exit poll from the 2012 election, 77% of Korean Americans voted for Democrat Barack Obama, while only 20% voted for Republican Mitt Romney. The poll also showed that 60% of Korean Americans identify themselves as being Democrats, while only 14% of Korean Americans identify themselves as being Republican. 

In the 2016 presidential election, a majority of Korean Americans (75%) voted for Hillary Clinton.

Korean Americans in Congress

Elected in 1992, Jay Kim was the first Korean American person elected to Congress. He represented portions of Orange County, California. He was defeated for re-election in the Republican primary in 1998.  

In 2018, Andy Kim was elected to Congress from central New Jersey, becoming the first Democratic and second overall Korean American to serve in Congress.

The 2020 elections saw the first three Korean American women elected to Congress, Republicans Young Kim and Michelle Steel of California and Democrat Marilyn Strickland of Washington.

Out of the five Korean Americans elected to the U.S. Congress, only Andy Kim was born in the United States: Jay Kim, Young Kim, Michelle Steel, and Marilyn Strickland were all born in Korea and immigrated, with Strickland having a father in the American military.

Religion

Korean Americans have historically had a very strong Christian—particularly Protestant—heritage. Between 60% and 65% identify as Christian; 40% of those consist of immigrants who were not Christians at the time of their arrival in the United States. There are about 4,000 Korean Christian churches in the United States. According to a 2016 survey, Presbyterian churches accounted for 42%, followed by Baptists (17%) and Methodists (12%). However, according to a recent study by UC Riverside, 64% of Korean American Christians identify as Presbyterians, followed by Methodists (11%) and Baptists (7%).

There are only 89 Korean Buddhist temples in the United States; the largest such temple, Los Angeles' Sa Chal Temple, was established in 1974. A small minority, about 2 to 10% of Korean Americans are Buddhist. Reasons given for the conversion of immigrant Korean families to Christianity include the responsiveness of Christian churches to immigrant needs as well as their communal nature, whereas Buddhist temples foster individual spirituality and practice and provide fewer social networking and business opportunities, as well as social pressure from other Koreans to convert. Most Korean American Christians do not practice traditional Confucian ancestral rites practiced in Korea (in Korea, most Catholics, Buddhists, and nonbelievers practice these rites).

Cuisine

"Korean American cuisine" can be described as a fusion of traditional Korean cuisine with American culture and tastes. Dishes such as "Korean tacos" have emerged from the contacts between Korean bodega owners and their Mexican workers in the Los Angeles area, spreading from one food truck (Kogi Korean BBQ) in November 2008 to the national stage eighteen months later.

According to Chef Roy Choi (of Kogi Korean BBQ fame), sundubu-jjigae was a dish developed by Korean immigrants in Los Angeles. In 2021, Thrillist named Bergen County, New Jersey as America’s best Korean barbecue destination.

Often, chefs borrow from Korean flavors and preparation techniques that they will integrate into the style they are most comfortable with (whether it be Tex-Mex, Chinese or purely American). Even a classic staple of the American diet, the hamburger, is available with a Korean twist—bulgogi (Korean BBQ) burgers.

With the popularity of cooking and culinary sampling, chefs, housewives, food junkies and culinary aficionados have been bolder in their choices, favoring more inventive, specialty and ethnic dishes. Already popular in its subset populations peppered throughout the United States, Korean food debuted in the many Koreatowns found in metropolitan areas including in Los Angeles; Garden Grove and  Bunea Park in Orange County, California; Queens and Manhattan in New York City; Palisades Park and Fort Lee in Bergen County, New Jersey; Annandale, Virginia; Philadelphia; Atlanta; Dallas; and Chicago. Korean cuisine has unique and bold flavors, colors and styles; these include kimchi, an often spicy dish made of salted and fermented vegetables (baechu-kimchi, kkaktugi), long-fermented pastes (gochujang, doenjang), rice cake or noodle dishes and stews (tteok-bokki, naengmyun), marinated and grilled meats (bulgogi, galbi), and many seafood dishes using fish cakes, octopus, squid, shellfish and fish.

The Korean dining scene was noted to have grown sharply in New Jersey during 2018. Broad Avenue in Bergen County's Palisades Park Koreatown in New Jersey has evolved into a Korean dessert destination as well; while a five-mile long "Kimchi Belt" has emerged in the Long Island Koreatown in New York.

Korean coffeehouse chain Caffe Bene, also serving misugaru, has attracted Korean American entrepreneurs as franchisees to launch its initial expansion into the United States, starting with Bergen County, New Jersey and the New York City Metropolitan Area.

Undocumented immigration 

In 2012, the Department of Homeland Security estimated that there were 230,000 "unauthorized immigrants" born in South Korea; they are the seventh-largest nationality of undocumented immigrants behind those from Mexico, El Salvador, Guatemala, Honduras, the Philippines and India.

Notable people

See also

 Asian Americans
 Demographics of the United States
 Greater Dallas Korean American Chamber of Commerce
 International adoption of South Korean children
 Joseon–United States Treaty of 1882
 KoreAm
 Korean diaspora
 Korean National Association
 Koreans in New York City
 Koreans in Washington, D.C.
 Koreans
 Koreatown
 Koreatown, Fort Lee
 Koreatown, Long Island
 Koreatown, Los Angeles
 Koreatown, Manhattan
 Koreatown, Palisades Park
 Koreatown, Philadelphia
 List of American writers of Korean descent
 List of Korean Americans
 National Korean American Service & Education Consortium (NAKASEC) – progressive immigrant rights organization
 yKAN
 History of Korean Americans in Greater Los Angeles

References

Further reading
 Abelmann, Nancy and Lie, John. Blue Dreams: Korean Americans and the Los Angeles Riots. (1995). 272 pp.
 Kibria, Nazli. Becoming Asian American: Second-Generation Chinese and Korean American Identities (2003) 
 Kim, Ilpyong J. Korean-Americans: Past, Present, and Future (Hollym International, 2004).
 Kim, Katherine Yungmee. Los Angeles's Koreatown (2010)
 Korean American Historical Society, comp. Han in the Upper Left: A Brief History of Korean Americans in the Pacific Northwest. (Seattle: Chin Music, 2015. 103 pp.)
 Kwak, Tae-Hwan, and Seong Hyong Lee, eds. The Korean American Community: Present and Future (Seoul: Kyungnam University Press, 1991).
 Lehrer, Brian. The Korean Americans (Chelsea House, 1988).
 Min, Pyong Gap. Caught in the Middle: Korean Communities in New York and Los Angeles. (1996). 260 pp.
 
 Nash, Amy. "Korean Americans." in Gale Encyclopedia of Multicultural America, edited by Thomas Riggs, (3rd ed., vol. 3, Gale, 2014), pp. 23–39. online
 Oh, Arissa H., "From War Waif to Ideal Immigrant: The Cold War Transformation of the Korean Orphan," Journal of American Ethnic History (2012), 31#1 pp 34–55.
 Park, Kyeyoung. The Korean American Dream: Immigrants and Small Business in New York City (1997)
 Park, Kyu Young. Korean Americans in Chicago (2003)
 Patterson, Wayne. The Korean Frontier in America: Immigration to Hawaii, 1896–1910 (University of Hawaii Press, 1988).
 Patterson, Wayne, and Hyung-Chan Kim. Koreans in America (Lerner Publications, 1992)
 Takaki, Ronald. From the Land of Morning Calm: The Koreans in America (Chelsea House, 1994).
 Won Moo Hurh. The Korean Americans (Greenwood Press, 1998).

External links

 Korean Cultural Center
 KoreanAmericanStory.org: A Non-profit Organization Dedicated to Preserving Stories of Korean-Americans
 Arirang – Interactive History of Korean Americans 
 AsianWeek: Korean American Timeline
 KoreAm Journal
 Korean-American Community and Directory
 Korean American Foundation
 Korean American Heritage Foundation
 Korean American Historical Society
 Korean American literature
 The Korean American Museum
 Early Korean Immigrants to America: Their Role in the Establishment of the Republic of Korea

American people of Korean descent
American
Asian-American society
East Asian American